Bugs Bunny in Double Trouble is a Looney Tunes video game developed by Atod AB for the Sega Genesis and Game Gear, released in 1996. The game stars Bugs Bunny and features pre-rendered 3D graphics.

Gameplay 
The main levels are loosely based on various classic Bugs Bunny cartoons, such as "Duck! Rabbit, Duck!", "Bully for Bugs", "Knighty Knight Bugs" and many more, including a bonus level which is accessed by collecting Bonus Stars in the main levels, only in the Genesis version.

Levels 
Duck! Rabbit, Duck!
Bully for Bugs/Roman Legion-Hare
Hare-abian Nights
Knighty Knight Bugs
Haunted Hare
Spaced Out Bunny (Genesis version only)
Mad as a Mars Hare
Hare-Way to the Stars

Items 
 Speed Shoes - Increases the player's speed
 Invulnerability Potion - Gives the player temporary invincibility
 Canned Carrot - Refills the health meter
 Giant Silver Carrot - Grants the player an extra life
 Stopwatch - Gives the player more time
 Bonus Star - Collect three of them to access the Bonus Level
 Glue Pot - Found in the Duck! Rabbit, Duck! level; can be used to slow down Daffy
 Carrot Weapons - Found in the Hare-abian Nights level. There are three types of weapons:
 Bull's-Eye Carrots - Aims directly at the target
 Homing Carrots - Flies straight towards the target
 Carrot Bombs - Hold down A to throw it further, then wait until it blows up

Enemies/Bosses 
 Daffy Duck - Chases the player
 Elmer Fudd - Wields a rifle, can instantly kill Bugs if the time runs out
 Caterpillar - Slowly squirms around
 Chipmunk - Tosses acorns at the player
 Toro the Bull: Runs at the player with horns out; can be used as a trampoline
 Lions
 Charging Lion: Chases Bugs in the underground section; also appears in the Game Gear version, replacing Toro's position
 Trapped Lion: Slashes at Bugs with its claws

 Four Thieves
 Thief 1 - Flies toward the player on a magic carpet
 Thief 2 - Utilizes a boomerang
 Thief 3 - Swings a sword
 Thief 4 - Punches the player
 Yosemite Sam (Sultan) - Rides on a magic carpet and uses the genie lamp to fire multiple balls at Bugs
 Small Knight - Charges at Bugs with a spear
 Baby Dragon - Swoops down at the player

 Yosemite Sam (Black Knight) - Wields a battle sword

 Dragon - Spits balls of fire from its mouth
 Count Bloodcount (Bat): Slowly flying towards the player
 Ghost: Slowly follows

 Gossamer - Attempts to slap Bugs
 Yosemite Sam (Mad Scientist) - Charging against the player, also riding on Gossamer's back in the laboratory section

 Witch Hazel - Disguises as a female rabbit that can regenerate Bugs' health. After a few seconds, she'll emerge and fire a magic ball, tricking the player
 Marvin the Martian - Attempting to knock back the player when riding the space scooter

 Flying Saucer (Marvin & K-9) - Flies towards Bugs, firing missiles and tossing dynamite sticks at him
 Instant Martians - Wields a laser pistol

K-9 - Charges at the player.

Plot
One night, Bugs Bunny is fast asleep in his bed, as he starts to drift off into a dream. In his dream, he sees Yosemite Sam experimenting on a "giant carrot serum", but before he could take action, Sam orders Gossamer to fetch the rabbit's brain for his robot, prompting chase. Bugs soon came across a "Televisor" and are transported to many of his times from older cartoons, in which he must complete several objectives in each level.

After finishing all 4 levels, Bugs Bunny attempts to escape the haunted castle and defeat both Gossamer and Yosemite Sam in the laboratory. He eventually succeeds and exits the castle to escape inside a rocket ship. Bugs soon found himself stranded in outer space after the launch, as he spots a nearby space scooter which he uses to travel across the galaxy and face a new threat: Marvin the Martian and his trusty pet dog K-9. Upon reaching Marvin's home planet, Mars, Bugs comes across some levers and switches them around, foiling Marvin's plans, and upon leaving back to Earth, he tosses the dynamite stick he previously rescued over to Marvin, resulting in the destruction of Mars itself. Eventually, Bugs wakes up back in his bed, only to find a giant carrot sitting right in front of him, much to his shock.

Development and release
Bugs Bunny in Double Trouble was released in the United States and Europe in August 1996.

Reception

The Genesis version received mediocre reviews. Critics widely praised the bright, colorful graphics and usage of old Warner Bros. cartoons and characters, though some criticized that the controls make navigating certain areas frustrating. However, reviews generally concluded that while the game is competent in most respects, it lacks any major innovation to draw the interest of anyone but hardcore Warner Bros. fans.

GamePro gave the Game Gear version a brief negative review, criticizing the gameplay, music, and particularly the difficult-to-see graphics, commenting that "signs, enemies, and items are so tiny you'll need a magnifying glass".

Game Informer gave the game an overall score of 7.25 out of 10 praising how sega did very well capturing the spirit of the cartoon and keeping the gameplay fast and random concluding: "Double Trouble is fairly perplexing at first, but once mastered it's a blast for all, especially the gaming youth!"

References

External links

1996 video games
Single-player video games
Platform games
Sega Genesis games
Game Gear games
Video games featuring Bugs Bunny
Video games featuring Daffy Duck
Video games about dreams
Video games with digitized sprites
Video games developed in the United Kingdom
Cartoon Network video games